Harcourt is a small Central Highlands town located approximately 9 km northeast of Castlemaine, where the Midland Highway meets the Calder Highway. At the 2021 census, Harcourt had a population of 1,038. The town was named after Sir William Harcourt.

History
 The Post Office opened on 27 February 1858 replacing that of nearby Mount Alexander open since 1856.

Overview 
Set in a valley at the foot of Mount Alexander, Harcourt was once the premier apple growing region in Australia (a title yielded to Tasmania some time ago). Still the apple centre of Victoria, the local area is fast getting a name for wine and cider production.

Other things of interest in and around the town are trout fishing and the numerous walking tracks in Mount Alexander Park. Within the park boundary there is an old oak forest which was established by the tanning industry for the acorns.  It is home to a World's largest apple. 
Each year on the March Labour Day long weekend the town hosts the Harcourt Applefest with local produce on sale in stalls, music concerts and several sports on show. Harcourt granite stone is widely used through Australia for soldier memorials, headstones and buildings of historical note.

The town has an Australian Rules football team competing in the Maryborough Castlemaine District Football League.

Harcourt railway station is on the Bendigo line, but has been closed since 1981. The closest operating train station is Castlemaine.

La Larr Ba Gauwa Mountain Bike Park is riding distance (2 km) from the centre of Harcourt.

Harcourt facilities include a small post office, a petrol station/general store, 2 cafes, community swimming pool, public hall, public toilets, recreation reserve, primary school and a motel.

References

External links

Community website Through the auspices Harcourt Heritage and Tourism Centre Inc, a community website has been created to promote the Township, Organisations and Businesses in Harcourt.

Towns in Victoria (Australia)